Pía Barros Bravo (born 20 January 1956) is a Chilean writer, best known for her short stories. She is associated with her country's literary Generation of '80.

Biography
Pía Barros left Melipilla, the city where she grew up, "without sorrow", together with "a good girl's destiny and the memory of the mare to which, from the age of seven, she told her poems." She moved to Santiago to study pedagogy in Spanish. There she also attended the workshop of Carlos Ruiz-Tagle (later, she herself would hold a famous workshop), who recommended that she stop "perpetrating poems on defenseless people" and devote herself to narrative. In 1989 she was a visiting professor at the University of Oregon, United States.

Pía Barros, who declares herself "a very honored feminist", has stood out for her short stories, although she has also written some novels. In addition, she has published some 30 object books with literary material illustrated by prominent Chilean graphic artists, which have earned her the Fondart fellowship on two occasions.

Her stories have been published in more than 30 anthologies, from countries such as Chile, Germany, Costa Rica, Ecuador, the United States (some translated by Martha Manier, Diane Russell, Analisa Taylor, Amanda Powell, Jacquline Nanfito, Resha Cardone, and Jane Griffin), France, Italy, Russia, and Venezuela. In Chile, they share a publication with stories by writers such as Roberto Bolaño, Alberto Fuguet, Antonio Skarmeta, Diamela Eltit, and Isabel Allende.

Barros has directed the literary workshop Ergo Sum since 1986. She is also the director of Ediciones Asterión.

She is married to the poet and journalist . They have been a couple since the early 1980s and have two daughters: Abril, a textile artist, and Miranda, a writer.

Works
 Miedos transitorios (de a uno, de a dos, de a todos), short stories, Ediciones Ergo Sum, 1985 (bilingual English-Spanish edition, 1993)
 A horcajadas, Mosquito Editores, Santiago, 1990 (bilingual English-Spanish edition, 1992). Contains 14 stories:
"Prefiguración de una huella", "Iniciaciones", "Conmiseración", "Olor a madera y a silencio", "Mordaza", "Desfiladero de Iguanas", "Diccionarios", "Duerme", "Artemisa", "Lo había odiado con pulcritud", "Navegaciones", "Trece", "Deshabitados ante la ventana", and "Los pequeños papeles"
 El tono menor del deseo, novel, Editorial Cuarto Propio, Santiago, 1991
 Astride, novel (bilingual edition by Analissa Taylor, 1992)
 Signos bajo la piel, stories, editorial Grijalbo, Santiago, 1994
 Ropa usada, stories, Ediciones Asterión, Santiago, 2000
 Lo que ya nos encontró, digital novel, Chilelibro.com, 2001 
 Los que sobran, stories, Asterión, Santiago, 2002
 Llamadas perdidas, minifictions, Thule Ediciones, Barcelona, 2006
 La Grandmother y otros, microstories, Asterión, Santiago, 2008
 El lugar del otro, microstories, Asterión, Santiago, 2010
 Las tristes, microstories, Asterión, Santiago, 2015
 Hebras, microstories, Asterión, Santiago, 2020

Stories in anthologies
 "Artemisa", in Andar con cuentos: nueva narrativa chilena 1948-1962, Mosquito Editores, Santiago, 1992
 "Baldosas", in Bajo techo, Ministry of Housing and Urbanism, Santiago, 1995
 "Muertes", in Salidas de madre, Planeta Chile, Santiago, 1996
 "Puertas", in Cuentos: Taller Soffia '84 (Chile, Arcilla, 1984)
 "El orden de las cosas", in Cuentos chilenos contemporáneos 2000, (LOM Ediciones, Santiago, 2001)

Awards and distinctions
 Finalist for the 2003 Altazor Award with Los que sobran
 Finalist for the 2008 Altazor Award with La Grandmother y otros
 2011 Altazor Award for El lugar del otro
 2015 Lygia Fagundes Telles Award, given during the 8th Conference of Women Writers of Brazil
 Fellowships from Fondart, Andes Foundation, and National Book and Reading Council

References

External links

 Blog by Pía Barros with some of her short stories
 

1956 births
20th-century Chilean women writers
20th-century Chilean novelists
20th-century Chilean short story writers
21st-century Chilean women writers
21st-century Chilean novelists
21st-century Chilean short story writers
Chilean women short story writers
Chilean feminist writers
Living people
People from Melipilla Province
Chilean women novelists